Frank Chamberlain Clark (1872–1957) was an American architect active in Southern Oregon.  Many of his works are listed on the National Register of Historic Places (NRHP).

Clark has been said to be "the leading architect of the Rogue River Valley from the time of his  arrival in southern Oregon in 1902 to his retirement in 1945."

Clark was joined in partnership by Robert Keeney in 1935.

Works
All are in Oregon, unless indicated otherwise

in chronological order
Ashland Masonic Lodge Building (1909), 25 N Main St, Ashland, NRHP-listed
First Baptist Church (1911), 241 Hargadine St, Ashland, NRHP-listed
Barnum Hotel (1914), 204 N Front St, Medford, NRHP-listed
Craterian Ginger Rogers Theater (1924), Medford 
Holly Theatre (1929–30), 226 W 6th St, Medford, NRHP-listed
Frank Chamberlain Clark House (1930), 1917 E Main St, Medford.  Colonial Revival. NRHP-listed
Chauncy M. Brewer House (1930), E. Main St., Medford.  Colonial Revival.

not in chronological order
▪Ulrich House (1922), 839 Minnesota Ave., Medford. Colonial Revival
Walter Bowne House, 1845 Old Stage Rd, Jacksonville, NRHP-listed 
BPOE Lodge No. 1168, 202 N Central Ave, Medford, NRHP-listed
Victor and Bertha Bursell House, 3075 Hanley Rd, Central Point, NRHP-listed 
Carter-Fortmiller House, 514 Siskiyou Blvd, Ashland, NRHP-listed
Chappell-Swedenburg House, 990 Siskiyou Blvd, Ashland, NRHP-listed
Michael Clemens House, 612 NW 3rd St, Grants Pass, NRHP-listed
Corning Court Ensemble, 5-16 Corning Ct, Medford, NRHP-listed
E. Raymond Driver House, 4140 Old Stage Rd, Central Point, NRHP-listed
Enders Building, 250-300 E Main St, Ashland, NRHP-listed
Fluhrer Bakery Building, 29 N Holly St, Medford, NRHP-listed
C. E. "Pop" Gates House, 1307 Queen Anne Ave, Medford, NRHP-listed
Glenview Orchard Ensemble, 1395 Carpenter Hill Rd, Phoenix, NRHP-listed 
Edgar F. Hafer House, 426 W 6th St, Medford, NRHP-listed
Liberty Building, 201 W Main St, Medford, NRHP-listed
Medford Central Firehall, 110 E 6th St, Medford, NRHP-listed
Humboldt Pracht House, 234 Vista St, Ashland, NRHP-listed
Root-Banks House, 11 N Peach St (1000 W Main St), Medford, NRHP-listed
Sparta Building, 12 N Riverside St, Medford, NRHP-listed
Dr. Charles T. and Mary Sweeney House, 2336 Table Rock Rd, Medford, NRHP-listed 
George Taverner House, 912 Siskiyou Blvd, Ashland, NRHP-listed
Henry Van Hoevenberg, Jr., House, 9130 Ramsey Canyon Rd, Gold Hill, NRHP-listed

References

Architects from Oregon
1872 births
1957 deaths